Radio Rama or Radio postaja Rama is a Bosnian local public radio station, broadcasting from Prozor-Rama, Bosnia and Herzegovina.

It was launched on 6 June 1993 by local municipal council as public company JP "Radio Rama" d.o.o.. This radio station broadcasts a variety of programs such as music, talk shows and local news. Program is mainly produced in Croatian from 8 am to 6:30 pm.

Estimated number of potential listeners of Radio Rama is around 10.615

The radio station is also available in municipalities Jablanica and Konjic and program is also available via internet for listeners in BiH or in diaspora.

Frequencies
The program is currently broadcast at one frequency.

 Prozor-Rama

See also 
List of radio stations in Bosnia and Herzegovina
 Radio Konjic 
 Radio Jablanica

References

External links 
 www.fmscan.org
 www.radiostanica.ba
 Communications Regulatory Agency of Bosnia and Herzegovina

Prozor-Rama
Radio stations established in 1993